Separation from a healthcare facility occurs anytime a patient (or resident) leaves because of death, discharge, sign-out against medical advice or transfer. The number of separations is the most commonly used measure of the utilization of hospital services. Separations, rather than admissions, are used because hospital abstracts for inpatient care are based on information gathered at the time of discharge.

This is one of the measures of morbidity used when determining the burden of a disease. The second factor used is the length of hospital stay. In Australia, the main hospital separations of 2004–05 were:
 Digestive system problems.
 Neoplasms.
 Injury/Poisoning.
 Pregnancy/Child birth.
 Musculoskeletal diseases.
 Genitourinary diseases.
 Respiratory diseases.

On the other hand, as expected the length of hospital stay spans out as follow (from longest to shortest):
 Mental/Behavioural disorders: Schizophrenia, delusional disorders, mood disorders.
 Circulatory system diseases.
 Neoplasms.
 Injury/Poisoning.

References

Hospitals